Vladimír Moravčík (born December 5, 1981) is a Slovak middleweight Muay Thai Fighter.

He was ranked #7 light heavyweight kickboxer in the world in May 2011, by Liverkick.com.

Biography and career

Moravčík started training Muay Thai when he joined the Fire Gym in his hometown of Banská Bystrica in Slovakia.  This was after he got out of the army, where he'd had some Muay Thai training.

The highlight of his career was his fight against former Rajadamnern Stadium Champion and world title holder, Diesellek TopkingBoxing, which he won by KO.

Moravčík has signed with the newly formed Muay Thai Premier League.

He beat Jose Barradas on October 27, 2012, in Nitra, Slovakia when Barradas broke his leg in round one.

He competed in a four-man tournament at W5 Slovakia on March 16, 2013, stopping Artem Litvinenko with second round body shots in the semi-finals before facing Darryl Sichtman in the final. After three rounds, the judges declared an extra round but he was unable to continue having been damaged from repeated low kicks.

Titles
 2018 Enfusion 80 kg World champion
 2017 Enfusion 80 kg World champion 
 2016 WMC World Middleweight (-72.6 kg) Champion 
 2015 WFCA World Muay Thai (-75 kg) Champion
 2013 WMC European Muay Thai (-76.2 kg) Champion 
 2013 W5 Slovakia 75 kg Tournament Runner-up
 2010 I-1 Grand Slam Champion
 2010 W5 League World Champion K-1 (75 kg) Champion 
 2010 WPMF Intercontinental Muay Thai Champion 
 2009 WKN European Muay Thai Champion 
 2008 Dodge Trophy Winner 
 2007 I-1 WMC World Muay Thai Champion
 2005 S-1 European Muay Thai Champion

Kickboxing record

|-  bgcolor="#CCFFCC"
| 2022-06-18 || Win ||align=left| Joao Paulo de Carvalho || DFN 7: Nastal čas || Zvolen, Slovakia  || Decision (Unanimous) || 3 || 3:00
|-  bgcolor="#CCFFCC"
| 2022-05-21 || Win ||align=left| Rony Paradeiser  || Oktagon Underground: Vemola vs Marpo || Prague, Czech Republic || Decision (Unanimous) || 4 || 3:00
|-
! style=background:white colspan=9 |
|-  bgcolor="#CCFFCC"
| 2021-02-27 || Win ||align=left| Igor Daniš || Oktagon UNGD: Last Man Standing|| Brno, Czech Republic || KO (Left Body Hook)|| 1 || 2:30
|-  bgcolor="#FFBBBB"
| 2019-04-27 || Loss ||align=left| Robin Ciric || Enfusion live || Žilina, Slovakia || KO  || 4 || 
|-
! style=background:white colspan=9 |
|-  bgcolor="#CCFFCC"
| 2018-12-01 || Win ||align=left| Saknarong Suklerd || Enfusion || Czech Republic || KO (Right Mid Kick)|| 3 || 0:38
|-  bgcolor="#FFBBBB"
| 2018-10-27 || Loss ||align=left| Yohan Lidon || Fight Legend Geneva || Geneva, Switzerland || TKO (Ref. Stop/Right Cross) || 1 || 1:45
|-  bgcolor="#CCFFCC"
| 2018-07-06 || Win ||align=left|  Thongchai Sitsongpeenong||All Star Fight 5 || Czech Republic || decision || 3 || 3:00
|-  bgcolor="#CCFFCC"
| 2018-04-28|| Win ||align=left| Nampom PhuketTopTeam || Enfusion Live || Žilina, Slovakia || KO (Knees)|| 4 || 1:07
|-  bgcolor="#c5d2ea"
| 2017-10-14|| Draw ||align=left| Yuri Bessmertny || Rebuy Stars Fight Night || Slovakia || Draw || 3 || 3:00
|-  bgcolor="#CCFFCC"
| 2017-05-06|| Win ||align=left| Hicham El Gaoui || Enfusion Live || Žilina, Slovakia || decision || 5 || 3:00
|-
|-  bgcolor="#FFBBBB"
|2016-10-08 || Loss ||align=left| Alim Nabiev || W5 Grand Prix "Legends in Prague" || Prague, Czech Republic || Decision (Unanimous) || 5 || 3:00
|-
! style=background:white colspan=9 |
|-
|-  bgcolor="#CCFFCC"
| 2016-04-23|| Win ||align=left| Weerawaut Kaewkamnerd  || Enfusion 39 || Žilina, Slovakia || Decision || 5 || 3:00
|-
! style=background:white colspan=9 |
|-
|-  bgcolor="#CCFFCC"
| 2015-12-05 || Win ||align=left| Matouš Kohout || GIBU Fight Night 2  || Prague, Czech republic || Decision || 3 || 3:00
|-  bgcolor="#CCFFCC"
| 2015-10-03 || Win ||align=left| Dorian Price || Simpy the best - 6  || Poprad, Slovakia || TKO (Referee Stoppage) || 1 || 2:59
|-  bgcolor="#CCFFCC"
| 2015-05-30 || Win ||align=left| Shkodran Veseli || Full Fight 1 - Slovakia and Czech vs. Russia || Banska Bystrica, Slovakia || Decision (Unanimous) || 3 || 3:00
|-  bgcolor="#CCFFCC"
| 2015-04-25 || Win ||align=left| Yohan Lidon || Gala Night Thaiboxing / Enfusion Live 28  || Žilina, Slovakia || Decision (Unanimous) || 5 || 3:00
|-
! style=background:white colspan=9 |
|-  bgcolor="#FFBBBB"
| 2014-11-30 || Loss ||align=left| Darryl Sichtman || W5 Crossroad of Times || Bratislava, Slovakia || Decision || 5 || 3:00
|-
! style=background:white colspan=9 |
|-  bgcolor="#CCFFCC"
| 2014-04-26 || Win ||align=left| Miles Simson || Gala Night Thaiboxing / Enfusion Live 17 || Žilina, Slovakia || Decision (Unanimous) || 3 || 3:00
|-
|-  bgcolor="#FFBBBB"
| 2014-04-11 || Loss ||align=left| Djibril Eouho || Heroes Gate 12  || Prague, Czech republic || Decision (Unanimous) || 3 || 3:00
|-
|-
|-  bgcolor="#CCFFCC"
| 2014-01-25 || Win ||align=left| Abdrerrahim Chaffay || Clash Muay Thai  || Bratislava, Slovakia || KO || 1 || 2:36
|-
|-
|-  bgcolor="#CCFFCC"
| 2013-06-01 || Win ||align=left| Marco Piqué || Profiliga Muaythai 13  || Banska Bystrica, Slovakia || Decision (Unanimous) || 5 || 3:00
|-
! style=background:white colspan=9 |
|-  bgcolor="#FFBBBB"
| 2013-03-16 || Loss ||align=left| Darryl Sichtman || W5 Slovakia, Final || Bratislava, Slovakia || TKO (corner stoppage) || 3 || 3:00
|-
! style=background:white colspan=9 |
|-  bgcolor="#CCFFCC"
| 2013-03-16 || Win ||align=left| Artem Litvinenko || W5 Slovakia, Semi Finals || Bratislava, Slovakia || KO (body punches) || 2 || 
|-  bgcolor="#CCFFCC"
| 2012-12-08 || Win ||align=left| Raphaël Llodra || Fight Explosion || Bratislava, Slovakia || Decision (Unanimous) || 3 || 3:00
|-  bgcolor="#CCFFCC"
| 2012-10-27 || Win ||align=left| Jose Barradas || Nitrianska Noc Bojovnikov || Nitra, Slovakia || TKO (broken leg) || 1 ||
|-  bgcolor="#FFBBBB"
| 2012-05-26 || Loss  ||align=left| Yodsanklai Fairtex || Profiliga Muaythai 12||Banska Bystrica, Slovakia  || TKO  || 3 || 
|-
! style=background:white colspan=9 |
|-
|-  bgcolor="#CCFFCC"
| 2012-03-31 || Win ||align=left| Gil Silva || Gala Night Thaiboxing 2012 || Zilina, Slovakia || TKO (Punch) || 2 || 0:28
|-  bgcolor="#CCFFCC"
| 2011-11-06 || Win ||align=left| Yohan Lidon || Muay Thai Premier League 3rd Round || The Hague, Netherlands || Decision (Unanimous) || 3 || 3:00 
|-  bgcolor="#c5d2ea"
| 2011-10-08 || Draw ||align=left| Rosario Presti || Muaythai Premier League: Round 2 || Padova, Italy || Decision Draw || 5 || 3:00
|-  bgcolor="#CCFFCC"
| 2011-06-23 || Win ||align=left| Anatoly Hunanyan || Heroes Gate 4 || Prague, Czech Republic || Decision || 3 || 3:00
|-  bgcolor="#CCFFCC"
| 2011-05-28 || Win ||align=left| Diesellek TopkingBoxing || PROFILIGA MUAY THAI XI. || Banská Bystrica, Slovakia || KO || 4 || 1:51
|-  bgcolor="#CCFFCC"
| 2011-03-12 || Win ||align=left| Khalid Chabrani || Gala Night Thaiboxing || Zilina, Slovakia || TKO || 1 || 2:41
|-  bgcolor="#CCFFCC"
| 2011-02-05 || Win ||align=left| Abdoul Toure || Slovak Power Ring of Honor || Nitra, Slovakia || TKO (Referee Stoppage) || 3 || 2:06
|-  bgcolor="#CCFFCC"
| 2010-12-10 || Win ||align=left| Mohamed Houmer || Noc bojovníků Hodonín  || Hodonin, Czech Republic || TKO || 3 || 
|-  bgcolor="#CCFFCC"
| 2010-11-20 || Win ||align=left| Andreas Rogner || I-1 World Muay Thai Grand Slam 2010, Final  || Hong Kong || KO || 2 || 
|-
! style=background:white colspan=9 |
|-  bgcolor="#CCFFCC"
| 2010-11-20 || Win ||align=left| Thiago Teixeira || I-1 World Muay Thai Grand Slam 2010, Semi Final || Hong Kong || Decision (Unanimous) || 3 || 3:00
|-  bgcolor="#CCFFCC"
| 2010-09-25 || Win ||align=left| Uranbek Esenkulov || W5 League Gala || Moscow, Russia || Decision (Unanimous) || 5 || 3:00
|-
! style=background:white colspan=9 |
|-  bgcolor="#CCFFCC"
| 2010-05-29 || Win ||align=left| Cristian Dorel || PROFILIGA Muay Thai X || Banská Bystrica, Slovakia || TKO (Referee Stoppage) || 4 || 
|-  bgcolor="#CCFFCC"
| 2010-05-01 || Win ||align=left| Simon Chu || One Songchai || Rimini, Italy || KO (Liver Punch) || 3 || 
|-  bgcolor="#CCFFCC"
| 2010-03-21 || Win ||align=left| Fadi Merza || Gala Night Zilina 2010 || Zilina, Slovakia || Decision || 3 || 3:00
|-  bgcolor="#FFBBBB"
| 2009-12-12 || Loss  ||align=left| Artur Kyshenko || K-1 ColliZion 2009 Final Tournament, Super Fight || Prague, Czech Republic || KO (Right High Kick) || 2 || 2:43
|-  bgcolor="#CCFFCC"
| 2009-10-16 || Win  ||align=left| Foad Sadeghi || Return of the Gladiators 2009 Brno || Brno, Czech Republic || Decision || 5 || 3:00
|-  bgcolor="#CCFFCC"
| 2009-08-29 || Win  ||align=left| Murthel Groenhart || It's Showtime 2009 Budapest || Budapest, Hungary || Decision || 3 || 3:00
|-  bgcolor="#CCFFCC"
| 2009-06-24 || Win  ||align=left| Robert Zytkiewicz || Noc Bojovniku  || Šumperk, Czech Republic ||  || 5 || 
|-
! style=background:white colspan=9 |
|-
|-  bgcolor="#CCFFCC"
| 2009-05-23 || Win  ||align=left| Pracha Somchan || PROFILIGA Muay Thai IX || Banská Bystrica, Slovakia || Decision || 5 || 3:00
|-
|-  bgcolor="#CCFFCC"
| 2009-03-14 || Win ||align=left|  Berneung Topkingboxing || Gala Night Thaiboxing || Žilina, Slovakia || Decision (Majority) || 5 || 3:00
|-
|-  bgcolor="#CCFFCC"
| 2008-11-16 || Win  ||align=left| Armen Petrosyan || Dodge Trophy 2008, Final  || Ulm, Germany || KO || 5 || 
|-
! style=background:white colspan=9 |
|-  bgcolor="#CCFFCC"
| 2008-11-16 || Win  ||align=left| Alban Ahmeti || Dodge Trophy 2008, Semi Finals  || Ulm, Germany || Decision || 3 || 
|-  bgcolor="#CCFFCC"
| 2008-11-16 || Win  ||align=left| Labinot Ahmeti || Dodge Trophy 2008, Quarter Finals || Ulm, Germany || Decision (Unanimous) || 3 || 3:00
|-  bgcolor="#FFBBBB"
| 2008-10-11 || Loss  ||align=left| Cosmo Alexandre || I-1 GP EURO Muay Thai || Bratislava, Slovakia || Decision || 5 || 3:00
|-  bgcolor="#CCFFCC"
| 2008-09-12 || Win  ||align=left| Marfio Canoletti || K-1 Slovakia 2008 || Bratislava, Slovakia || Decision (Unanimous) || 3 || 3:00
|-  bgcolor="#CCFFCC"
| 2008-06-28 || Win  ||align=left| Yuri Gorbachev || PROFILIGA Muay Thai VII || Banská Bystrica, Slovakia || Decision || 5 || 3:00
|-  bgcolor="#CCFFCC"
| 2008-04-06 || Win  ||align=left| Pavel Abozn || PROFILIGA Muay Thai VI || Banská Bystrica, Slovakia || KO || 3 || 
|-  bgcolor="#CCFFCC"
| 2008-02-10 || Win  ||align=left| Edvardas Norieulikus ||  || Zilina, Slovakia || KO (Right Cross) || 2 || 0:58
|-  bgcolor="#CCFFCC"
| 2007-12-30 || Win  ||align=left| Olan Sor Thaweesist || Christmas Fighters Evening || Prague, Czech Republic || KO || 3 || 0:28
|-  bgcolor="#CCFFCC"
| 2007-10-15 || Win  ||align=left| Kit Sitpholek || I-1 4 Man Tournament 2008, Finals || Hong Kong || KO || 2 || 
|-
! style=background:white colspan=9 |
|-  bgcolor="#CCFFCC"
| 2007-10-15 || Win  ||align=left| Denis Varaksa || I-1 4 Man Tournament 2008, Semi Finals || Hong Kong || TKO || 3 || 
|-  bgcolor="#CCFFCC"
| 2007-09-07 || Win  ||align=left| Walid Haddad || Noc Bojovníkov 2007 || Bratislava, Slovakia || Decision || 3 || 3:00
|-  bgcolor="#CCFFCC"
| 2007-07-07 || Win  ||align=left| Milos Selesi || PROFILIGA Muay Thai III || Banská Bystrica, Slovakia || Decision ||  || 
|-  bgcolor="#CCFFCC"
| 2007-05-26 || Win  ||align=left| Barnabas Szucs || PROFILIGA Muay Thai II || Banská Bystrica, Slovakia || Decision (Unanimous) || 5 || 3:00
|-  bgcolor="#CCFFCC"
| 2007-02-20 || Win  ||align=left| Kazuyoshi Imara ||  ||  || KO (Left Hook) || 4 || 1:22
|-  bgcolor="#CCFFCC"
| 2006-12-30 || Win  ||align=left| Prasanchai Looknongyangtoy || Christmas Fighters Evening || Prague, Czech Republic || Decision || 5 || 3:00
|-  bgcolor="#CCFFCC"
| 2006-09-26 || Win  ||align=left| Jiří Apeltauer || Fighters Evening || Pardubice, Czech Republic || Decision ||  || 
|-  bgcolor="#CCFFCC"
| 2006-04-20 || Win  ||align=left| Jaroslav Devera || Fighters Evening || Liberec, Czech Republic || Decision ||  || 
|-  bgcolor="#CCFFCC"
| 2006-03-30 || Win  ||align=left| Igor Chin || Fighters Evening || Pardubice, Czech Republic || Decision ||  ||
|-  bgcolor="#CCFFCC"
| 2005-05-27 || Win  ||align=left| Maciej Skupiński || S-1 Extravaganza || Ostrava, Czech Republic || KO (Right Elbow) || 1 ||  
|-
| colspan=9 | Legend:

See also 
List of K-1 events
List of K-1 champions
List of It's Showtime events
List of male kickboxers

External links 
Vladimír Moravčík's Official Homepage

References

1981 births
Living people
Slovak male kickboxers
Middleweight kickboxers
Sportspeople from Banská Bystrica